Jason Ian Drucker is an American child actor. He starred as Greg Heffley in the 2017 film Diary of a Wimpy Kid: The Long Haul. He also played Tommy Miller, the youngest of the Miller family, in Nickelodeon's Every Witch Way. In 2018, he co-starred in the Transformers spin-off Bumblebee.

Personal life

Drucker was born in Hollywood, Florida. Drucker is Jewish. He is also an anti bullying activist.

Drucker first rose to prominence with his role in Nickelodeon's Every Which Way, where he played the role of Tommy Miller. Drucker's film debut Barely Legal came out in 2015. Drucker was also in 2017's Diary of a Wimpy Kid: The Long Haul, where he played the protagonist, Greg Heffely. He also had a co-starring role in 2018's Bumblebee.

Filmography

Film

Television

Theatre

Awards and nominations

References

External links

21st-century American male actors
American male child actors
American male film actors
Place of birth missing (living people)
2000s births
Living people
People from Hollywood, Florida